Mucilaginibacter is a genus from the family of Sphingobacteriaceae.

Species
The genus Mucilaginibacter comprises the following species:

M. amnicola
M. angelicae
M. antarcticus
M. aquaedulcis
M. auburnensis
M. boryungensis
M. calamicampi
M. carri
M. composti 
M. craterilacus
M. daejeonensis
M. defluvii
M. dorajii
M. flavus 
M. frigoritolerans
M. galii
M. ginsengisoli
M. ginsenosidivorax 
M. gossypii 
M. gossypiicola 
M. gotjawali 
M. gracilis
M. gynuensis
M. herbaticus 
M. jinjuensis 
M. kameinonensis
M. koreensis 
M. lappiensis
M. litoreus
M. lutimaris
M. mallensis
M. myungsuensis 
M. oryzae 
M. paludis
M. panaciglaebae
M. pineti  
M. polysacchareus 
M. polytrichastri  
M. psychrotolerans
M. rigui  
M. rubeus
M. roseus  
M. sabulilitoris 
M. soli 
M. soyangensis 
M. vulcanisilvae  
M. ximonensis   
M. yixingensis

References

Further reading 
 
 
 
 
 
 

Sphingobacteriia
Bacteria genera